Messiah is a satirical novel by Gore Vidal, first published in 1954 in the United States by E.P. Dutton. It is the story of the creation of a new religion, Cavism, which quickly comes to replace the established but failing Christian religion.

Plot summary 

The novel is written as the memoir of Eugene Luther (Vidal’s birth name), one of the first followers of Cavism, founded by John Cave, an American undertaker. Cave teaches, among other things, not to fear death and to actually desire it under certain circumstances. Later followers come to glorify death, and even enforce it on other members. The founder John Cave is himself killed by his followers when he proves inconvenient for the new religion's development.

Eventually, Cavism is successful in completely displacing and exterminating Christianity, even to the extent of all Gothic Cathedrals being systematically blown up and destroyed in order to erase any memory of the tradition. The narrator, having quarrelled with the other religious leaders, finds refuge in Egypt – Islamic countries having forbidden Cavism any access to their territory. He eventually discovers that his name was removed from the Cavist Scriptures which he had himself composed. Also, a woman Cavist leader named Iris, whom he had known, becomes a new manifestation of the ancient Mother Goddess – which had earlier been manifested in The Virgin Mary and before that in Isis and others. This "Irisian" element becomes grafted on to Cavism, as it was earlier grafted on Christianity.

References

1954 American novels
Novels by Gore Vidal
Novels about religion
American satirical novels
E. P. Dutton books
Dystopian novels